Sainte-Anastasie (Auvergnat: Senta Ostàsia) is a former commune in the Cantal department in south-central France. On 1 December 2016, it was merged into the new commune Neussargues en Pinatelle.

Population

See also
Communes of the Cantal department

References

Former communes of Cantal
Cantal communes articles needing translation from French Wikipedia
Populated places disestablished in 2016